Belgic may refer to:

 an adjective referring to the Belgae, an ancient confederation of tribes
 a rarer adjective referring to the Low Countries or to Belgium
 , several ships with the name
 Belgic ware, a type of pottery
 Belgic Confession, a Christian doctrinal standard

See also 
 Belgique, Missouri, an unincorporated community in Missouri
 Belgica (disambiguation)
 Belgian (disambiguation)